Bannatoli is a village development committee in Achham District in the Seti Zone of western Nepal. According to the 1991 Nepal census, it has a population of 2600 and had 642 houses in the village. At the time of the 2001 Nepal census, the population was 2712, of which 28% was literate.
The population is entirely Hindu.

References

Populated places in Achham District
Village development committees in Achham District